Saifullah Abdullah Paracha is a citizen of Pakistan who was held, without any charge, in the United States Guantanamo Bay detainment camps, in Cuba for over 18 years. He was released on October 29, 2022. As of 18 May 2021, Saifullah Paracha was approved for release by American authorities after his son Uzair Paracha's conviction was overturned in 2018 and the younger Paracha was repatriated to Pakistan in March 2020.

On 29 October 2022, Pakistan's Foreign Office Spokesperson Asim Iftikhar stated that Saifullah Paracha has been released from Guantanamo prison and has returned to Pakistan.

Early life 

The Department of Defense reports that Paracha was born on August 17, 1947 in Mangwal, Pakistan. He graduated from a university in Karachi with a degree in physics and attended New York Institute of Technology, studying computer systems analysis.

At the time of his capture, Paracha legally resided in the United States, in Queens, New York City. He managed various businesses such as travel agencies, real estate, and a media company. He obtained his green card in 1980.

Arrest 

Officials pretending to be Kmart representatives told him they need to meet him in Bangkok, Thailand, to discuss a deal. He was captured by FBI agents in July 2003. He was accused of meeting Osama Bin Laden and helping 'facilitate financial transactions and propaganda' for the 9/11 orchestrators. He also allegedly met with bin Laden during a delegation of Pakistani dignitaries.

He was then taken to Bagram Airbase in Afghanistan where he was initially held.

A little over a year into his imprisonment, he suffered a heart attack and was moved to Guantanamo Bay. He underwent heart surgery in 2006 at the hospital in Guantanamo Bay.

Combatant Status Review 

A Summary of Evidence memo was prepared for Saifullah Paracha's Combatant Status Review Tribunal, on October 6, 2004.

Saifullah Paracha v. George W. Bush 

A writ of habeas corpus, Saifullah Paracha v. George W. Bush, was submitted on Saifullah Paracha's behalf.
In response, on December 21, 2004, the Department of Defense published fifty-eight pages of unclassified documents related to his Combatant Status Review Tribunal.

On December 8, 2004, Tribunal panel 24 convened and confirmed Saifullah Paracha's "enemy combatant" status.

Press reports 
On July 12, 2006, the magazine Mother Jones provided excerpts from the transcripts of a selection of the Guantanamo detainees.
Paracha was one of the detainees profiled.
According to the article his transcript contained the following exchange:

On June 2, 2008 Zachary Katznelson appealed to the Pakistani government for assistance, stating:

Joint Review Task Force 

On January 21, 2009, the day he was inaugurated, United States President Barack Obama issued three Executive orders related to the detention of individuals in Guantanamo Bay.
That new review system was composed of officials from six departments, where the OARDEC reviews were conducted entirely by the Department of Defense.  When it reported back, a year later, the Joint Review Task Force classified some individuals as too dangerous to be transferred from Guantanamo, even though there was no evidence to justify laying charges against them. On April 9, 2013, that document was made public after a Freedom of Information Act request.

Saifullah Paracha was one of the 71 individuals deemed too innocent to charge, but too dangerous to release.
Obama said those deemed too innocent to charge, but too dangerous to release would start to receive reviews from a Periodic Review Board.

Periodic Review Board 

The first review wasn't convened until November 20, 2013. Paracha was approved for transfer on May 13, 2021.

Paracha's son 

Paracha's son, Uzair Paracha, was convicted in 2005 for providing support to Al-Qaeda, that included assistance for Majid Khan to obtain documents.

On July 3, 2018, 15 years after his arrest, Uzair's conviction was deemed void by Judge Sidney H. Stein based on newly discovered statements made by Ammar Al Baluchi, Majid Khan and Khalid Sheikh Mohammad. Stein, who oversaw Paracha's trial and imposed his sentence, called it a "manifest injustice" to let the conviction stand and granted Paracha's request, made in November 2008, for a new trial.

Uzair was freed on the 13th of March, 2020 and willingly repatriated to Pakistan, giving up his resident status.

References

External links

 Secret US cables accessed by Dawn through WikiLeaks: Saifullah Paracha's continued detention at Gitmo a mystery
 Saifullah Paracha Reprieve
 UN Secret Detention Report (Part Two): CIA Prisons in Afghanistan and Iraq Andy Worthington, June 16, 2010
 The Paracha Family: From 1947 till now, a support site

1947 births
Living people
Detainees of the Guantanamo Bay detention camp
Pakistani extrajudicial prisoners of the United States
Bagram Theater Internment Facility detainees
People subject to extraordinary rendition by the United States
University of Karachi alumni
New York Institute of Technology alumni